The German Spitz is a breed of spitz-type dogs from Germany. It is considered a single breed, with five distinct varieties based on size and colour: the Wolfsspitz/Keeshond, the Giant Spitz or Großspitz, the Medium Spitz or Mittelspitz, the Miniature Spitz or Kleinspitz and the Pomeranian or Zwergspitz ("Dwarf Spitz").

History 
The German Spitz breed is believed to be descended from Nordic spitz-type herding dogs that were the common ancestor to other breeds such as the Samoyed, the Finnish and the Swedish Lapphund. It is believed these Nordic dogs spread throughout Northern Europe and as far as Britain during the Middle Ages with the Vikings, the earliest mentions of spitz dogs in German literature date from AD 1450. In 1750, Count Eberhand zu Sayre Buffon wrote in his National history of quadrupeds that spitz dogs were the ancestor of all German breeds.

German Spitz dogs were originally kept on farms for a number of roles including herding and guarding. As the centuries progressed some lines were bred to be smaller for other duties and eventually as small companion dogs.

Description 
The German Spitz is a long-haired, double-coated breed of spitz-type dog; the five varieties vary significantly in size. The breed standard states all variants have a double coat with a long, straight and outer coat and a short, thick, cotton-wool like undercoat.

Wolfsspitz/Keeshond 
The coat is silver-grey with black shading.

Giant Spitz 
The Giant Spitz is a medium-sized dog. It usually weighs  and according to the breed standard stands ; the coat can be white, black or brown, black and brown animals can have white spots on the chest, paws and tip of tail.

Medium Spitz 
The Medium Spitz is a medium-sized dog. It usually weighs  and according to the breed standard stands ; the coat can be white, black, brown, orange, grey-shaded and other colours.

Miniature Spitz 
The Miniature Spitz is a small dog. It usually weighs  and according to the breed standard stands ; the coat can be white, black, brown, orange, grey-shaded and other colours.

Pomeranian 
The Pomeranian (or Zwergspitz, "Dwarf Spitz") is a small dog. It usually weighs  and according to the breed standard stands ; the coat can be white, black, brown, orange, grey-shaded and other colours.

References

External links

German Spitz World in the UK
German Spitz Breeders & Owners Club in the UK

Animal breeds on the GEH Red List
Companion dogs
Dog breeds originating in Germany
FCI breeds
Rare dog breeds
Spitz breeds